is a 2013 Japanese erotic drama film directed by Takashi Ishii, based on a novel of the same name by  and starring Mitsu Dan, Yuki Mamiya and Tsuyoshi Nakano. It was released on 21 September 2013.

Plot

Cast
Mitsu Dan as Naoko
Yuki Mamiya as Naoko (17 years old)
Tsuyoshi Nakano
Hiroko Nakajima
Naoto Takenaka
Hiroko Yashiki

Reception

Accolades

References

External links

2010s erotic drama films
Films based on Japanese novels
Films directed by Takashi Ishii
Japanese erotic drama films
Kadokawa Daiei Studio films
2013 drama films
2013 films
2010s Japanese films